= Astypalaea (Samos) =

Town of ancient Greece on the island of Samos

Coordinates: 37°42′16″N 26°56′39″E

Astypalaea or Astypalaia (Ancient Greek: Ἀστυπάλαια) was a town of ancient Greece on the island of Samos according to Stephanus of Byzantium, said by others to be either the acropolis of the city of Samos, or the name of half of the city.

The town is presumably on the mountain of the same name which modern scholars have located on Samos.
